Orestias parinacotensis is a species of pupfish in the family Cyprinodontidae. It is endemic to northern Chile. This fish was described in 1982 by María Gloria Eliana Arratia Fuentes from a type locality given as a wetland near the hamlet of Parinacota, Chile called the Bofedales de Parinacota.

References

parinacotensis
Freshwater fish of Chile
Fish described in 1982
Taxonomy articles created by Polbot
Endemic fauna of Chile